USS YMS-61 was a United States Navy  auxiliary motor minesweeper during World War II. She was laid down 23 September 1941 by the Gibbs Gas Engine Co. She was commissioned on 23 June 1942. Assigned to the Caribbean she operated in the former Netherlands Antilles. She was struck from the Naval Registry on 19 June 1946.

Citations

 

YMS-1-class minesweepers of the United States Navy
World War II minesweepers of the United States
1941 ships
Ships sunk by mines